The 1962 Isly massacre was an incident during the Algerian War when French Army soldiers opened fire on a crowd of Pied-Noir demonstrators marching in support of France's control over Algeria on 26 March 1962. In response to news of the signing of the Évian Accords, which ended the Algerian War in favour of Algeria's independence, crowds of anti-independence Pied-Noirs marched throughout Algiers, denouncing the treaty's terms.

45 French troops from the 4th Tirailleur Regiment manning a roadblock opened fire at a crowd of demonstrators who were marching towards the neighbourhood of Bab El Oued, killing between 50 and 80 Pied-Noir civilians. In response to news of the massacre, Pied-Noirs began a mass exodus from Algeria to Metropolitan France. On 26 January 2022, French president Emmanuel Macron formally acknowledged the massacre at the Élysée Palace.

Background

Algeria was gradually incorporated into the French colonial empire after France began a military conquest in 1830. The region became known as French Algeria, and hundreds of thousands of European immigrants known as Pied-Noirs (Black Feet), the vast majority of whom were of French descent, began to immigrate to the colony. By the mid-20th century, there were approximately a million Pied-Noirs residing in French Algeria, with most having been born in North Africa instead of Europe; cumulatively, they formed roughly ten percent of Algeria's population in the mid-1950's.

On 1 November 1954, the anti-colonial National Liberation Front (FLN) launched a series of attacks against military, police and civilian targets, sparking the Algerian War. The FLN carried out guerrilla operations against the French authorities, who responded by waging a brutal military counterinsurgency. After seven years of fighting, president of France Charles de Gaulle signed the Évian Accords with the FLN's provisional government on 18 March 1962, ending the war; the treaty proved unpopular with most Pied-Noirs, who supported continued French rule in Algeria.

Massacre

On 26 March, a crowd of Pied-Noirs marched in the Algerian capital of Algiers in opposition to the Évian Accords, as they did not wish for Algeria to become independent of French colonial rule. As the crowd was attempting to march towards the neighbourhood of Bab El Oued, they were confronted on the Rue d'Isly by 45 French Army soldiers from the 4th Tirailleur Regiment, which had been stationed in Algiers. The French Army, anticipating violent confrontations with anti-independence Pied-Noirs, had installed roadblocks throughout the city, including one on the Rue d'Isly.  

The soldiers manning the roadblock, who were later described as "poorly commanded and deployed against their will", in response to the unarmed crowd's continual advance towards them, responded by opening fire at them using machine guns. French troops continued to fire at the crowd for approximately fifteen minutes, killing several demonstrators. It was subsequently estimated that the massacre's death toll amounted to at least 50 people; the highest estimates claimed that 80 were killed. News of the massacre spread throughout Algeria after it occurred.

Aftermath

In response to news of the massacre, Pied-Noirs began a mass exodus from Algeria to Metropolitan France, which would eventually involve the migration of roughly 900,000 people; the majority of them settled in Southern France. After arriving in France, the Pied-Noirs were "deeply impacted by the sense of loss and longing for their country of birth" and "faced discrimination in France and were treated as outsiders." In France, several Pied-Noir activist organisations consistently lobbied for the government of France to issue a public acknowledgement of the massacre in 1962.

On 26 January 2022, French president Emmanuel Macron acknowledged the massacre in a meeting with a group of French citizens of Pied-Noir descent at the Élysée Palace. In a speech, Macron stated that "this massacre of March 26, 1962 is unforgivable for the Republic. That day, French soldiers, deployed counter-intuitively, morally damaged, fired on the French. It is high time to say it. What was to be an operation of order ended in a massacre." Macron also expressed remorse that Pied-Noirs in France "were not received and listened to" by the French government.

References

Footnotes

Bibliography

External links
 Photographs from the massacre

1962 in Algeria
20th century in Algiers
Algerian War
Demonstrations
March 1962 events in Africa
Massacres committed by France
Massacres in Algeria
Protests in Algeria